Udzha is an impact crater on Mars, that measures  in diameter, but has been almost entirely covered by layers of ice and dust. Only the highest part of the crater rim rises above the polar deposits and hint at its circular form. Udzha Crater is located at 81.8 degrees north latitude, 77.2 degrees east longitude on Mars. It was named after a village in northern Russia.

References 

Impact craters on Mars
Mare Boreum quadrangle